Wayne County High School is located in Jesup, Georgia, United States. It is the only public high school in Wayne County.

The school was founded in 1966 from the consolidation of Jesup, Odum, Screven and Northside high schools. Originally located on Orange Street, it moved to its current campus in 2002. However in 2022 only Baseball  Football and Softball are held at the original campus.

Extracurricular activities
Wayne County's mascot is the Yellow Jacket. Sports offered include:
 Baseball
 Basketball
 Cross country
 Football 
 Golf
 Marching band
 Soccer
 Softball
 Swimming
 Tennis
 Track
 Wrestling
Clubs offered include:
 Beta
 Café
 Drama
 FBLA
 FCA
 FFA
 HOSA
 STEM (Science, Technology, Engineering, and Math club)
 Student Council
 Y-Club
 Yearbook

The school's fight song is sung to the tune of the "Washington and Lee Swing".

State Titles
Baseball (1) - 1967(2A) 
Football (1) - 1959(2A) 
Slow Pitch Softball (1) - 1998(3A/4A)

State Titles won as Jesup High School
Football (1) - 1954(A) 
Literary (6) - 1947(B), 1948(B), 1949(B), 1951(B), 1952(B), 1954(A)

Alma Mater
"We honor thee for all you've done to help us great and small. We stand erect with heads unbowed to ever heed thy call. Honor the gold and the white; hold them high! Cling to the things that are right, Wayne County High! Cherish the memories of days that were bright, and forget every cloud in the sky, Hail to Wayne County High!"

Notable alumni
 Barret Browning - former professional baseball player
 Len Hauss - former NFL football player
 Tre' Jackson - former NFL football player
 T. Y. McGill - current NFL football player
 Lindsay Scott - former NFL football player
 John Warren - former NFL football player

References

External links 
 Wayne County High School
 Wayne County Schools

Public high schools in Georgia (U.S. state)
Schools in Wayne County, Georgia
1966 establishments in Georgia (U.S. state)
Educational institutions established in 1966